Tina Nadine Smith (born 12 June 2002) is an Australian tennis player.

Smith has a career-high WTA ranking of 561 in singles. She has won one singles title and one doubles title as a professional on the ITF Circuit.

She made her WTA Tour main-draw debut at the 2022 Adelaide International 2, where she partnered Annerly Poulos in the doubles competition.

Smith lives in Meggen, Switzerland and has dual Swiss-Australian citizenship.

ITF Circuit finals

Singles: 3 (1 title, 2 runner-ups)

Doubles: 1 (1 title)

References

External links
 
 

2002 births
Living people
Australian female tennis players
Sportspeople from Lucerne
Swiss people of Australian descent
Australian emigrants to Switzerland